Petar Krstić (February 18, 1877 – January 21, 1957) was a Serbian composer and conductor known throughout Yugoslavia.

Born in Belgrade, Krstić studied under the Austrian composer Robert Fuchs and the Bohemian-Austrian musicologist Guido Adler in Vienna. He worked as a conductor and pedagogue in Belgrade as well as musical leader of Belgrade radio. His most famous operas include Zulumcar (1927) and Ženidba Jankovic Stojana (1948). He is best known for his overtures, chamber music, and choir works.

See also
 Kosta Manojlović
 Miloje Milojević
 Stevan Hristić
 Stevan Mokranjac
 Isidor Bajić
 Davorin Jenko
 Jovan Đorđević
 Josif Marinković
 Nenad Barački
 Tihomir Ostojić
 Stefan Stratimirović
 Stefan Lastavica
 Stanislav Binicki

References

Sources

External links
Selection of works (in German)

1877 births
1957 deaths
19th-century composers
19th-century male musicians
Yugoslav composers
20th-century male musicians
Male composers
Serbian opera composers